Teupitzer See is a lake in Teupitzer Gewässer, Brandenburg, Germany. It is located in the town of Teupitz.

References

Lakes of Brandenburg
Dahme-Spreewald
Federal waterways in Germany
LTeupitzerSee